Tavastia (Old Russian Ямь or Емь) is a historical province in the south of Finland. It borders Finland Proper, Satakunta, Ostrobothnia, Savonia and Uusimaa.

Administration 
From 1997 to 2010 Tavastia was divided between the administrative provinces of Southern Finland and Western Finland. However, these provinces have been abolished, and Tavastia is now divided among five regions of Finland: mainly Tavastia Proper (Kanta-Häme), Päijänne Tavastia and Central Finland with smaller parts in Pirkanmaa and Kymenlaakso. Tavastia is the Latin name for the Tavastia Proper. Today the area is called Häme region and it is located in the southwestern section of the historical Tavastia province.

History 

The prehistoric era of Tavastia can be said to end with the Second Swedish Crusade in 1239 or 1249, when it became part of Sweden. The construction of the Häme castle began in the 1260s, on the orders of Birger Jarl. It was to be the centre of the three "castle counties", the other two being the castle of Turku in Finland Proper and Viipuri castle in Karelia. After the peace Treaty of Nöteborg in 1323 the castle lost some of its importance as a defence against the East but remained an administrative centre. When Finland was ceded to Russia in September 1809, the province ceased to be a part of Sweden. The provinces have no administrative function today but live on as a historical legacy in both Finland and Sweden.

The province has been inhabited since the Stone Age. Northern Tavastia was for a long time a wilderness inhabited by Sami hunter-gatherers and frequented also by Finnish hunters. Only during the late Middle Ages was agriculture slowly introduced to the northern parts of the province. In the 19th century, the growth of the forest industry started to bring new wealth to the area. The waterways of Näsijärvi and Vanajavesi provided easy transport for timber. The most notable centres of the paper industry were, and still are, Mänttä and Valkeakoski. The most notable industrial center in historical Tavastia, however, is Tampere, where a number of large textile mills and metal factories have been operating since the early 19th century.

Geography 
Western Tavastia extends over both sides of the great Kokemäenjoki drainage basin. In Eastern Tavastia, the regions of Päijänne Tavastia and Central Finland are located around the shores of Lake Päijänne. The Southern borders of the province roughly follow the Salpausselkä ridge. The Southern parts of the province consist of plains intermixed with fields and forests. Towards the north, the land gradually rises and becomes more hilly. At the same time, the proportion of cultivated land decreases, and forest and heath become increasingly dominant. The northern boundary of Tavastia is in Central Finland. As this area was settled only at the time of the replacement of the old provincial system with the county system, the ancient provincial boundary is uncertain in this area. The same applies to the northwestern border with Satakunta, which is located in Pirkanmaa.

As a result of the original pattern of settlement, the inhabited areas are located around the waterways, fields encircling especially the largest lakes. The lakes are navigable but the rapids of Kymijoki and Kokemäenjoki restrict navigation to the sea. Similarly, the lakes form three separate navigable areas. Lake Näsijärvi can be navigated for over 100 kilometers north of Tampere, while the lakes Pyhäjärvi, Vanajavesi and Roine have been connected by canals since the 19th century, forming another significant waterway. On the other hand, Lake Päijänne, the second largest lake in Finland, connects Lahti and Päijänne Tavastia to Central Finland and Jyväskylä.

Heraldry 
Arms granted at the burial of Gustav I of Sweden in 1560. The arms are crowned by a ducal coronet, though by Finnish tradition this more resembles a Swedish count's coronet. Blazon: "Gules, a lynx passant or, ear tufts sable; in chief three mullets of six, in base four roses, all argent".

References 

Historical provinces of Finland
Kanta-Häme
Southern Finland Province
Western Finland Province